A list of the shipping facilities of the London, Midland and Scottish Railway is shown below:

List of ships of the London, Midland and Scottish Railway

Sources

 

Pre-grouping British railway companies
Big four British railway companies
London, Midland and Scottish Railway
 
Shipping facilities of the London, Midland and Scottish Railway
Lists of ships of the United Kingdom